

Events

Pre-1600
 904 – Sergius III is elected pope, after coming out of retirement to take over the papacy from the deposed antipope Christopher.
 946 – Caliph al-Mustakfi is blinded and deposed by Mu'izz al-Dawla, ruler of the Buyid Empire. He is succeeded by al-Muti as caliph of the Abbasid Caliphate.

1601–1900
1814 – War of the Sixth Coalition: France defeats Russia and Prussia in the Battle of Brienne.
1819 – Stamford Raffles lands on the island of Singapore.
1845 – "The Raven" is published in The Evening Mirror in New York, the first publication with the name of the author, Edgar Allan Poe.
1850 – Henry Clay introduces the Compromise of 1850 to the U.S. Congress.
1856 – Queen Victoria issues a Warrant under the Royal sign-manual that establishes the Victoria Cross to recognise acts of valour by British military personnel during the Crimean War. 
1861 – Kansas is admitted as the 34th U.S. state.
1863 – The Bear River Massacre: A detachment of California Volunteers led by Colonel Patrick Edward Connor engage the Shoshone at Bear River, Washington Territory, killing hundreds of men, women and children.
1886 – Karl Benz patents the first successful gasoline-driven automobile.
1891 – Liliuokalani is proclaimed the last monarch and only queen regnant of the Kingdom of Hawaii.

1901–present
1907 – Charles Curtis of Kansas becomes the first Native American U.S. Senator.
1911 – Mexican Revolution: Mexicali is captured by the Mexican Liberal Party, igniting the Magonista rebellion of 1911.
1918 – Ukrainian–Soviet War: The Bolshevik Red Army, on its way to besiege Kyiv, is met by a small group of military students at the Battle of Kruty.
  1918   – Ukrainian–Soviet War: An armed uprising organized by the Bolsheviks in anticipation of the encroaching Red Army begins at the Kiev Arsenal, which will be put down six days later.
1936 – The first inductees into the Baseball Hall of Fame are announced.
1940 – Three trains on the Nishinari Line; present Sakurajima Line, in Osaka, Japan, collide and explode while approaching Ajikawaguchi Station. One hundred and eighty-one people are killed.
1943 – World War II: The first day of the Battle of Rennell Island,  is torpedoed and heavily damaged by Japanese bombers.
1944 – World War II: Approximately 38 people are killed and about a dozen injured when the Polish village of Koniuchy (present-day Kaniūkai, Lithuania) is attacked by Soviet partisan units. 
  1944   – World War II: In Bologna, Italy, the Anatomical theatre of the Archiginnasio is completely destroyed in an air-raid.
1973 – EgyptAir Flight 741 crashes into the Kyrenia Mountains in Cyprus, killing 37 people.
1983 – Singapore cable car crash: Panamanian-registered oil rig, Eniwetok, strikes the cables of the Singapore Cable Car system linking the mainland and Sentosa Island, causing two cabins to fall into the water and killing seven people and leaving thirteen others trapped for hours.
1989 – Cold War: Hungary establishes diplomatic relations with South Korea, making it the first Eastern Bloc nation to do so.
1991 – Gulf War: The Battle of Khafji, the first major ground engagement of the war, as well as its deadliest, begins between Iraq and Saudi Arabia.
1996 – President Jacques Chirac announces a "definitive end" to French nuclear weapons testing.
2001 – Thousands of student protesters in Indonesia storm parliament and demand that President Abdurrahman Wahid resign due to alleged involvement in corruption scandals.
2002 – In his State of the Union address, President George W. Bush describes "regimes that sponsor terror" as an Axis of evil, in which he includes Iraq, Iran and North Korea.
2005 – The first direct commercial flights from mainland China (from Guangzhou) to Taiwan since 1949 arrived in Taipei. Shortly afterwards, a China Airlines flight lands in Beijing.
2008 – An Egyptian court rules that people who do not adhere to one of the three government-recognised religions, while not allowed to list any belief outside of those three, are still eligible to receive government identity documents.
2009 – Governor of Illinois Rod Blagojevich is removed from office following his conviction of several corruption charges, including solicitation of personal benefit in exchange for an appointment to the United States Senate as a replacement for then-U.S. president-elect Barack Obama.
2013 – SCAT Airlines Flight 760 crashes near the Kazakh city of Almaty, killing 21 people.
2014 – Rojava conflict: The Afrin Canton declares its autonomy from the Syrian Arab Republic.
2017 – A gunman opens fire at the Islamic Cultural Centre of Quebec City, killing six and wounding 19 others in a spree shooting.
2020 – COVID-19 pandemic: The Trump administration establishes the White House Coronavirus Task Force under Secretary of Health and Human Services Alex Azar.

Births

Pre-1600
1455 – Johann Reuchlin, German-born humanist and scholar (d. 1522)
1475 – Giuliano Bugiardini, Italian painter (d. 1555)
1499 – Katharina von Bora, wife of Martin Luther; formerly a Roman Catholic nun (d. 1552)
1525 – Lelio Sozzini, Italian humanist and reformer (d. 1562)
1584 – Frederick Henry, Prince of Orange (d. 1647)
1591 – Franciscus Junius, German pioneer philologist (d. 1677)

1601–1900
1602 – Countess Amalie Elisabeth of Hanau-Münzenberg (d. 1651)
1632 – Johann Georg Graevius, German scholar and critic (d. 1703)
1688 – Emanuel Swedenborg, Swedish astronomer, philosopher, and theologian (d. 1772)
1711 – Giuseppe Bonno, Austrian composer (d. 1788)
1715 – Georg Christoph Wagenseil, Austrian organist and composer (d. 1777)
1717 – Jeffery Amherst, 1st Baron Amherst, English field marshal and politician, 19th Governor General of Canada (d. 1797)
1718 – Paul Rabaut, French pastor (d. 1794)
1737 – Thomas Paine, English-American political activist, philosopher, political theorist, and revolutionary (d. 1809)
1749 – Christian VII of Denmark (d. 1808)
1754 – Moses Cleaveland, American general, lawyer, and politician, founded Cleveland, Ohio (d. 1806)
1756 – Henry Lee III, American general and politician, 9th Governor of Virginia (d. 1818)
1761 – Albert Gallatin, Swiss-American ethnologist, linguist, and politician, 4th United States Secretary of the Treasury (d. 1849)
1782 – Daniel Auber, French composer (d. 1871)
1792 – Lemuel H. Arnold, American politician (d. 1852)
1801 – Johannes Bernardus van Bree, Dutch violinist, composer, and conductor (d. 1857)
1810 – Ernst Kummer, Polish-German mathematician and academic (d. 1893)
  1810   – Mary Whitwell Hale, American teacher, school founder, and hymnwriter (d. 1862)
1843 – William McKinley, American soldier, lawyer, and politician, 25th President of the United States (d. 1901)
1846 – Karol Olszewski, Polish chemist, mathematician and physicist (d. 1915)
1852 – Frederic Hymen Cowen, Jamaican-English pianist, composer, and conductor (d. 1935)
1858 – Henry Ward Ranger, American painter and academic (d. 1916)
1860 – Anton Chekhov, Russian playwright and short story writer (d. 1904)
1861 – Florida Ruffin Ridley, American civil rights activist, teacher, editor, and writer (d. 1943)
1862 – Frederick Delius, English composer (d. 1934)
1864 – Richard Arman Gregory, British astronomer (d. 1952)
1866 – Romain Rolland, French historian, author, and playwright, Nobel Prize laureate (d. 1944)
1867 – Vicente Blasco Ibáñez, Spanish journalist and author (d. 1928)
1874 – John D. Rockefeller, Jr., American businessman and philanthropist (d. 1960)
1876 – Havergal Brian, English composer (d. 1972)
1880 – W. C. Fields, American actor, comedian, and screenwriter (d. 1946)
1881 – Alice Catherine Evans, American microbiologist (d. 1975)
1884 – Juhan Aavik, Estonian-Swedish composer and conductor (d. 1982)
1886 – Karl Freudenberg, German chemist (d. 1983)
1888 – Sydney Chapman, English mathematician and geophysicist (d. 1970)
  1888   – Wellington Koo, Chinese statesman (d. 1985)
1892 – Ernst Lubitsch, German American film director, producer, writer, and actor (d. 1947)
1895 – Muna Lee, American poet and author (d. 1965)

1901–present
1901 – Allen B. DuMont, American engineer and broadcaster, founded the DuMont Television Network (d. 1965)
  1901   – E. P. Taylor, Canadian businessman and horse breeder (d. 1989)
1905 – Barnett Newman, American painter and etcher (d. 1970)
1913 – Victor Mature, American actor (d. 1999)
1915 – Bill Peet, American author and illustrator (d. 2002)
  1915   – John Serry Sr., Italian-American concert accordionist and composer (d. 2003)
1916 – Roy Markham, British plant virologist (d. 1979)
1917 – John Raitt, American actor and singer (d. 2005)
1918 – John Forsythe, American actor (d. 2010)
1920 – Paul Gayten, American R&B pianist, songwriter, producer, and record company executive (d. 1991)
1923 – Paddy Chayefsky, American author and screenwriter (d. 1981)
  1923   – Eddie Taylor, American electric blues guitarist and singer (d. 1985)
1926 – Abdus Salam, Pakistani-British physicist and academic, Nobel Prize laureate (d. 1996)
1927 – Edward Abbey, American environmentalist and author (d. 1989)
1928 – Joseph Kruskal, American mathematician and computer scientist (d. 2010)
1929 – Elio Petri, Italian director and screenwriter (d. 1982)
1931 – Leslie Bricusse, English playwright and composer (d. 2021)
  1931   – Ferenc Mádl, Hungarian academic and politician, 2nd President of Hungary (d. 2011)
1932 – Raman Subba Row, English cricketer and referee
1933 – Sacha Distel, French singer and guitarist (d. 2004)
1934 – Alan Cowley, British chemist (d. 2020)
1936 – James Jamerson, American bass player (d. 1983)
  1936   – Veturi, Indian poet and songwriter (d. 2010)
1937 – Jeff Clyne, British musician (d. 2009)
1939 – Germaine Greer, Australian journalist and author
  1939   – Jeanne Lee, American jazz singer, poet and composer (d. 2000)
1940 – Justino Díaz, Puerto Rican opera singer
  1940   – Katharine Ross, American actress and author
1941 – Robin Morgan, American actress, journalist, and author
1942 – Arnaldo Tamayo Méndez, Cuban military officer, legislator and cosmonaut
1943 – Tony Blackburn, English radio and television host
  1943   – Pat Quinn, Canadian ice hockey player and coach (d. 2014)
  1943   – Mark Wynter, English singer and actor
1945 – Ibrahim Boubacar Keïta, Malian academic and politician, Prime Minister of Mali (d. 2022)
  1945   – Tom Selleck, American actor and businessman
1946 – Geater Davis, American singer and songwriter (d. 1984)
1947 – Linda B. Buck, American biologist and academic, Nobel Prize laureate
  1947   – David Byron, English singer-songwriter (d. 1985)
  1947   – Marián Varga, Slovak organist and composer (d. 2017)
1948 – Raymond Keene, English chess player and author
  1948   – Cristina Saralegui, Cuban-American journalist, actress and talk show host
1949 – Doris Davenport, American poet and teacher
  1949   – Tommy Ramone, Hungarian-American drummer and producer (d. 2014)
1950 – Ann Jillian, American actress and singer
  1950   – Miklós Vámos, Hungarian writer, novelist, screenwriter and translator
1952 – Pete Geren, American attorney and politician
  1952   – Tim Healy, British actor
1953 – Teresa Teng, Taiwanese singer (d. 1995)
  1953   – Charlie Wilson, American singer-songwriter and producer
1954 – Terry Kinney, American actor and director
  1954   – Oprah Winfrey, American talk show host, actress, and producer, founded Harpo Productions
1955 – John Tate, American boxer, WBA heavyweight champion (d. 1998)
1956 – Irlene Mandrell, American musician, actress, and model
  1956   – Amii Stewart, American singer and dancer
1957 – Ron Franscell, American author and journalist
1958 – Judy Norton, American actress and theater director
1960 – Cho-liang Lin, Taiwanese-American musician
  1960   – Greg Louganis, American diver and author
  1960   – Steve Sax, American baseball player
1961 – Strive Masiyiwa, Zimbabwean businessman and philanthropist
1962 – Gauri Lankesh, Indian journalist and activist (d. 2017)
  1962   – Lee Terry, American politician and lawyer
  1962   – Nicholas Turturro, American actor, director, producer, and screenwriter
1964 – Roddy Frame, Scottish singer-songwriter and musician
  1964   – Andre Reed, American football player
1965 – David Agus, American physician and author
  1965   – Dominik Hašek, Czech ice hockey player
1967 – Stacey King, American basketball player, coach, and sportscaster
1968 – Monte Cook, American game designer and writer
  1968   – Aeneas Williams, American football player
1969 – Sam Trammell, American actor
1970 – Heather Graham, American actress
  1970   – Jörg Hoffmann, German swimmer
  1970   – Rajyavardhan Singh Rathore, Indian colonel and politician
  1970   – Paul Ryan, American politician, 62nd Speaker of the United States House of Representatives
1971 – Clare Balding, English broadcaster, journalist and author
1972 – Brian Wood, American writer, illustrator and graphic designer
1973 – Megan McArdle, American journalist
1975 – Sharif Atkins, American actor
  1975   – Sara Gilbert, American actress, producer, and talk show host
1977 – Justin Hartley, American actor
  1977   – Sam Jaeger, American actor and screenwriter
1979 – Christina Koch, American engineer and astronaut
1980 – Jason James Richter, American actor and musician
1981 – Jonny Lang, American singer, songwriter and guitarist
1982 – Adam Lambert, American singer, songwriter and actor
1985 – Marc Gasol, Spanish basketball player
  1985   – Isabel Lucas, Australian actress and model
1987 – José Abreu, Cuban baseball player
  1987   – Jessica Burkhart, American author
1988 – Ayobami Adebayo, Nigerian author
  1988   – Jake Auchincloss, American politician, businessman, and Marine veteran
  1988   – Shay Logan, English footballer
1989 – Kevin Shattenkirk, American ice hockey player
1992 – Markel Brown, American basketball player
1993 – Kyary Pamyu Pamyu, Japanese singer

Deaths

Pre-1600
757 – An Lushan, Chinese general (b. 703)
1119 – Pope Gelasius II (b. 1060)
1597 – Elias Ammerbach, German organist and composer (b. 1530)

1601–1900
1647 – Francis Meres, English priest and author (b. 1565)
1678 – Jerónimo Lobo, Portuguese missionary and author (b. 1593)
1706 – Charles Sackville, 6th Earl of Dorset, English poet and courtier (b. 1643)
1737 – George Hamilton, 1st Earl of Orkney, Scottish-English field marshal and politician, Colonial Governor of Virginia (b. 1666)
1743 – André-Hercule de Fleury, French cardinal (b. 1653)
1763 – Juan José Eguiara y Eguren, Mexican bishop and Catholic scholar (b. 1696)
  1763   – Louis Racine, French poet (b. 1692)
1820 – George III of the United Kingdom (b. 1738)
1829 – Paul Barras, French captain and politician (b. 1755)
1870 – Leopold II, Grand Duke of Tuscany (b. 1797)
1888 – Edward Lear, English poet and illustrator (b. 1812)
1899 – Alfred Sisley, French-English painter (b. 1839)

1901–present
1901 – Eugène Louis-Marie Jancourt, French bassoonist, composer and pedagogue (b. 1815)
1906 – Christian IX of Denmark (b. 1818)
1910 – Édouard Rod, French-Swiss novelist (b. 1857)
1912 – Herman Bang, Danish journalist and author (b. 1857)
1916 – Sibylle von Olfers, German art teacher, author and nun (b. 1881)
1917 – Evelyn Baring, 1st Earl of Cromer, British statesman, diplomat and colonial administrator (b. 1841)
1923 – Elihu Vedder, American symbolist painter, book illustrator and poet (b. 1836)
1928 – Douglas Haig, 1st Earl Haig, Scottish field marshal (b. 1861)
1929 – Jacques Bouhy, Belgian baritone (b. 1848)
  1929   – Charles Fox Parham, American preacher and evangelist (b. 1873)
1933 – Sara Teasdale, American poet (b. 1884)
1934 – Fritz Haber, Polish-German chemist and engineer, Nobel Prize laureate (b. 1868)
  1934   – Dukinfield Henry Scott, British botanist (b. 1854)
1935 – Frederick Samuel Dellenbaugh, American explorer (b. 1853)
1940 – Edward Harkness, American philanthropist (b. 1874)
1941 – Ioannis Metaxas, Greek general and politician, 130th Prime Minister of Greece (b. 1871)
1944 – William Allen White, American journalist and author (b. 1868)
1946 – Harry Hopkins, American businessman and politician, 8th United States Secretary of Commerce (b. 1890)
  1946   – Sidney Jones, English conductor and composer (b. 1861)
1948 – Prince Aimone, Duke of Aosta (b. 1900)
1951 – James Bridie, Scottish playwright, screenwriter and physician (b. 1888)
1954 – Walter Conrad Arensberg, American art collector, critic and poet (b. 1878)
1955 – Hans Hedtoft, Danish politician (b. 1903)
1956 – H. L. Mencken, American journalist and critic (b. 1880)
1959 – Pauline Smith, South African novelist, short story writer, memoirist and playwright (b. 1882)
1960 – Mack Harrell, American operatic and concert baritone vocalist (b. 1909)
  1960   – George S. Messersmith, American diplomat (b. 1883)
1961 – Angela Thirkell, English novelist (b. 1890)
1962 – Fritz Kreisler, Austrian-American violinist and composer (b. 1875)
  1962   – William Francis Gray Swann, Anglo-American physicist (b. 1884)
1963 – Robert Frost, American poet and playwright (b. 1874)
1964 – Vera Hall, American folk singer (b. 1902)
  1964   – Alan Ladd, American actor (b. 1913)
1965 – Jack Hylton, English pianist, composer, band leader and impresario (b. 1892)
1966 – Pierre Mercure, Canadian composer, TV producer, bassoonist and administrator (b. 1927)
1967 – Harold Munro Fox, English zoologist (b. 1889)
1969 – Allen Dulles, American banker, lawyer, and diplomat, 5th Director of Central Intelligence (b. 1893)
1970 – Lawren Harris, Canadian painter (b. 1885)
  1970   – B. H. Liddell Hart, French-English soldier, historian, and journalist (b. 1895)
1973 – Johannes Paul Thilman, German composer (b. 1903)
1974 – H. E. Bates, English writer (b. 1905)
1976 – Jesse Fuller, American one-man band musician (b. 1896)
1977 – Johnny Franz, English record producer and pianist (b. 1922)
  1977   – Freddie Prinze, American comedian and actor (b. 1954)
1978 – Tim McCoy, American actor and military officer (b. 1891)
  1978   – Frank Nicklin, Australian politician, 28th Premier of Queensland (b. 1895)
1979 – Sonny Payne, American jazz drummer (b. 1926)
1980 – Jimmy Durante, American entertainer (b. 1893)
1981 – Jack A. W. Bennett, New Zealander literary scholar (b. 1911)
  1981   – John Glassco, Canadian poet, memoirist and novelist (b. 1909)
1982 – Rudolph Peters, British biochemist (b. 1889)
  1982   – Roger Stanier, Canadian microbiologist (b. 1916)
  1982   – Charles Sykes, British physicist and metallurgist (b. 1905)
1983 – Stuart H. Ingersoll, American naval aviator, USN vice admiral (b. 1898)
1984 – Frances Goodrich, American actress, dramatist and screenwriter (b. 1890)
  1984   – John Macnaghten Whittaker, British mathematician (b. 1905)
1987 – Vincent R. Impellitteri, American politician and judge, 101st Mayor of New York City (b. 1900)
1988 – James Rhyne Killian, American educator, scientist and White House advisor (b. 1904)
1989 – Morton DaCosta, American theatre and film director, film producer, writer and actor (b. 1914)
1991 – Yasushi Inoue, Japanese author and poet (b. 1907)
1992 – Willie Dixon, American singer-songwriter and producer (b. 1915)
1993 – Adetokunbo Ademola, Nigerian lawyer and jurist, 2nd Chief Justice of Nigeria (b. 1906)
1994 – Ulrike Maier, Austrian skier (b. 1967)
1999 – Lili St. Cyr, American model and dancer (b. 1918)
2002 – Harold Russell, Canadian-American soldier and actor (b. 1914)
2003 – Frank Moss, American lawyer and politician (b. 1911)
2004 – Janet Frame, New Zealand author and poet (b. 1924)
2005 – Ephraim Kishon, Israeli author, screenwriter, and director (b. 1924)
2006 – Nam June Paik, South Korean-American artist (b. 1932)
2008 – Margaret Truman, American singer and author (b. 1924)
2009 – Hélio Gracie, Brazilian martial artist (b. 1913)
  2009   – John Martyn, British singer-songwriter and guitarist (b. 1948)
2011 – Milton Babbitt, American composer, educator, and theorist (b. 1916)
2012 – Ranjit Singh Dyal, Indian general and politician, 10th Lieutenant Governor of Puducherry (b. 1928)
  2012   – Oscar Luigi Scalfaro, Italian lawyer and politician, 9th President of Italy (b. 1918)
  2012   – Camilla Williams, American soprano and educator (b. 1919)
2015 – Colleen McCullough, Australian neuroscientist, author, and academic (b. 1937)
  2015   – Rod McKuen, American singer-songwriter and poet (b. 1933)
  2015   – Alexander Vraciu, American commander and pilot (b. 1918)
2016 – Jean-Marie Doré, Guinean lawyer and politician, 11th Prime Minister of Guinea (b. 1938)
  2016   – Jacques Rivette, French director, screenwriter, and critic (b. 1928)
2019 – George Fernandes, Indian politician (b. 1930)
  2019   – James Ingram, American musician (b. 1952)
2021 – Walker Boone, Canadian actor (b. 1944)
2022 – Howard Hesseman, American actor (b. 1940)
2023 – Hazel McCallion, Canadian businesswoman and politician, 5th Mayor of Mississauga (b. 1921)
  2023   – Will Steffen, American-Australian chemist (b. 1947)
  2023   – Gero Storjohann, German politician (b. 1958)

Holidays and observances
 Christian feast day:
 Gildas
 Sabinian of Troyes
 Sulpitius I of Bourges
 January 29 (Eastern Orthodox liturgics)
Earliest day on which Fat Thursday can fall, while March 4 is the latest; celebrated on Thursday before Ash Wednesday. (Christianity)
Kansas Day (Kansas, United States)

References

External links

 BBC: On This Day
 
 Historical Events on January 29

Days of the year
January